The Ministry of Popular Culture (commonly abbreviated to MinCulPop) was a ministry of the Italian government from 1937 to 1944.

History
It was established by the Fascist government in 1922 as the Press Office of the Presidency of the Council, before being renamed to Press Office of the Head of Government in 1925. In 1934 it became the Secretariat for Press and Propaganda. It became a ministry in 1935 and was given its definitive designation in 1937. During its existence, it controlled most of the literary and radio channels in Italy. It was the Italian analogue of the German Reich Ministry of Public Enlightenment and Propaganda.

The Ministry financed various Fascist publications, including La Difesa della Razza. It famously outlawed the importation and translation of all American comic books, with the lone exception of Mickey Mouse, in 1938.

The Ministry was officially suppressed by the Kingdom of Italy on 3 July 1944, having remained vacant ever since the overthrow of Benito Mussolini in the 25 Luglio coup a year earlier. During the Italian Social Republic, Mussolini revived the Ministry of Popular Culture and appointed Ferdinando Mezzasoma as its head.

List of Ministers

Kingdom of Italy
Parties

Coalitions

Italian Social Republic
Parties

Coalitions

See also
 Propaganda of Fascist Italy
 Censorship in Italy
 Reichs Ministry of Public Enlightenment and Propaganda

References

Further reading
 

Political history of Italy
Popular Culture
Italian Fascism
Censorship in Italy
Italy
Ministries established in 1935
Ministries disestablished in 1943
1935 establishments in Italy
1943 disestablishments in Italy